OSCI can refer to:
Open SystemC Initiative, now Accellera
Oshkosh Correctional Institution